Maelstrom is a novel by Australian writer E. V. Timms. It is set in 17th century France in the period following the death of Cardinal Richelieu.

The novel was revised and republished in 1955 as Ten Wicked Men.

References

External links
Maelstrom at AustLit

1938 Australian novels
Novels set in Early Modern France
Australian historical novels
Novels set in the 17th century
Angus & Robertson books